The Epistles of Clement are two letters ascribed to Clement of Rome (fl. 96):
 First Epistle of Clement;
 Second Epistle of Clement, not by the same author;

"Epistle of Clement" may also refer to:
 Ethiopic Clement, an epistle traditionally attributed as written by the apostle Peter to Clement; part of the wider Orthodox Tewahedo biblical canon

Clement